Malcolm Jellicoe (born 1 July 1963) is a Zimbabwean former rugby union player who played as scrum-half.

Career
Jellicoe first played for Zimbabwe in the 1987 Rugby World Cup, which he captained, playing all the three pool stage matches, without scoring any try. He retired from the international career after the tournament.

References

External links

1963 births
Zimbabwean rugby union players
Rugby union scrum-halves
White Zimbabwean sportspeople
Living people